Clinton House may refer to:

in the United States
(by state)
Clinton House (Fayetteville, Arkansas), listed on the National Register of Historic Places (NRHP)
Bill Clinton Birthplace, Hope, Arkansas, NRHP-listed
Bill Clinton Boyhood Home, Hot Springs, Arkansas, listed on the NRHP in Arkansas
Clinton House (Liberty, Missouri), listed on the NRHP in Missouri
Capt. F. L. Clinton House, Pascagoula, Mississippi, listed on the NRHP in Mississippi
Charles Clinton Stone Row House, Tonopah, Nevada, NRHP-listed
Clinton House (Ithaca, New York), a 19th-century building listed on the NRHP
Morris Clinton House, Newark Valley, New York, NRHP-listed
Clinton House (Poughkeepsie, New York), NRHP-listed
Clinton-Hardy House, Tulsa, Oklahoma, NRHP-listed